The 115th Independent Brigade of the Territorial Defense Forces is a military formation of the Territorial Defense Forces of Ukraine in Zhytomyr Oblast. It is part of Operational Command North.

History

Formation 
In 2018 the brigade was formed in Zhytomyr Oblast.

During September 2019 330 reservists from 139th battalions took part in a training exercise. After it concluded a new larger scale Brigade wide exercise, involving over 1,500 troops took place.

From 22 September to 1 October 2021 Ukraine held large scale exercise "United efforts-2021". Over 1,300 soldiers and reservists from the brigade participated. 143rd battalion and 300 soldiers from 139th battalion took part in that exercise.

On 26 January 2022 commander Colonel Muzhuk Mykhailo, informed that Brigade was 70% formed.

Russo-Ukrainian War

2022 Russian invasion of Ukraine
In early march, unit of brigade captured an enemy Ural truck.
Brigade is defending north border with Belarus, improving defensive positions and continuously training and destroying HESA Shahed 136 drone.

Structure 
As of 2022 the brigade's structure is as follows:
 Headquarters
 138th Territorial Defense Battalion (Zhytomyr) А7304
 139th Territorial Defense Battalion (Berdychiv) А7305
 140th Territorial Defense Battalion (Zviahel) А7306
 141st Territorial Defense Battalion (Ovruch) А7307
 142nd Territorial Defense Battalion (Malyn) А7308
 143rd Territorial Defense Battalion (Korosten) А7309
 Counter-Sabotage Company
 Engineering Company
 Communication Company
 Logistics Company
 Mortar Battery

Commanders 
 Colonel Muzhuk Mykhailo 2021 - 2022
 Colonel Makovskyi Vitalii 2022 - present

See also 
 Territorial Defense Forces of the Armed Forces of Ukraine

References 

Territorial defense Brigades of Ukraine
2018 establishments in Ukraine
Military units and formations established in 2018